Bugayevka is a rural locality (a settlement) in Olkhovatskoye Urban Settlement, Olkhovatsky District, Voronezh Oblast, Russia. The population was 1,717 as of 2010. There are 11 streets.

Geography 
Bugayevka is located 4 km northeast of Olkhovatka (the district's administrative centre) by road. Olkhovatka is the nearest rural locality.

References 

Rural localities in Olkhovatsky District